The following persons have been awarded the Belgian Medal of Military Merit for exceptional services to the Belgian Armed Forces since the creation of the medal in 2005.

2015 
The Medal of Military Merit was awarded to six members of the Belgian Armed Forces.
 Warrant Officer P. Gautier 
 First Master Corporal Steve Maertens
 First Master Corporal Pascal Branswyk
 First Master Corporal Hans Claessens
 Master Corporal Emmanuel Godart
 Corporal Kenny Lemmens

2014 
The Medal of Military Merit was awarded to eight members of the Belgian Armed Forces.
 Captain-Commandant (Reserve) J. Berger
 Captain-Commandant (Air Force) Renaud Thys
 Captain-Commandant (Air Force) Joffrey Dellis
 Chief Warrant Officer Alidor Haccourt
 Chief Warrant Officer Wim Van Thielen
 First Master Corporal Patrick Christiaens
 First Master Corporal Fabien Wattiaux
 Corporal Niels Scrayen

2013 
The Medal of Military Merit was awarded to twelve military and one civilian members of the Belgian Armed Forces.
 Mrs. Martine Prospero
 Captain Christophe Comhair
 Master Warrant Officer Patrick Eerdekens
 Master Warrant Officer Ivan Fierens
 Master Warrant Officer Erik Vanloffelt
 Master Warrant Officer (Air Force Reserve) E. Vercruysse
 Master Warrant Officer Patrick Weckx
 Chief Warrant Officer Patrick Choquet
 Chief Warrant Officer Marino Eeckhout
 Chief Warrant Officer Erik Sainte
 Chief Warrant Officer Paul Weijtens
 First Sergeant-Major Olivier Elsen
 First Master Corporal Eric Andre

2012 
The Medal of Military Merit was awarded to eight members of the Belgian Armed Forces.
 Lieutenant-General (Air Force) François Florkin
 Colonel (Medical Reserve) Paul Vanneste, MD
 Master Warrant Officer Gerald Hernalsteen
 Master Warrant Officer Patrick Vermeulen
 Chief Warrant Officer Erik Bejstrup
 First Master Corporal Frank Boelens
 Private First Class Timothy De Mars
The Medal of Military merit was awarded to two members of the United States Air Force. 
 Colonel Mark E. Carter
 Major Anthony F. Sidoti
from the Office of Defense Cooperation of the United States embassy in Belgium and Luxemburg, for their contribution to the Belgian Air Component operations during its military intervention above Libya.

2011 
The Medal of Military Merit was awarded to eleven members of the Belgian Armed Forces. 
 Lieutenant-General Baudouin Somers (Aide to the King) 
 Lieutenant Luc Gille
 Chief Warrant Officer Emmanuel Livemont
 Master Warrant Officer Peter Prevot
 Chief Warrant Officer P. Cosse
 Chief Warrant Officer Stefaan Mouton
 Warrant Officer E. Rits
 First Master Corporal C. Lessire
 First Master Corporal R. Senesael
 First Master Corporal Philippe Trickels
 First Master Corporal Luc Volders

2010 
The Medal of Military Merit was awarded to eleven members of the Belgian Armed Forces. 
 Major Werner Lauwers
 Major Rik Olievier 
 Major Danny Snelders
 Master Warrant Officer A. Baccus
 Master Warrant Officer Danny Tielens
 Warrant Officer musician R. De Klippel
 First Sergeant Lionel Likin 
 First Sergeant Philippe Scimar
 First Master Corporal Alain Jetteur
 First Master Corporal Chris Mertens
 Master Corporal Sean Vereecken 
The Medal of Military merit was awarded to one member of the French Army. 
 Brigade General Philippe Léonard, former commander of the Multinational Task Force North of the allied forces in Kosovo, of which the Belgian detachment was member.

2009 
The Medal of Military Merit was awarded to ten members of the Belgian Armed Forces. 
 Warrant Officer Pascal Blanchart
 Warrant Officer Philippe Boon
 Warrant Officer Ivo Henkens
 First Master Chief Michel Bouché
 First Master Chief D. Thonon
 Sergeant James Ching
 First Master Corporal Bruno Coenen
 First Master Corporal Daniel Kolczyk 
 First Master Corporal Yvan Moriamé

2008 
The Medal of Military Merit was awarded to ten members of the Belgian Armed Forces, including for the first time an officer from the reserve corps and an Air Force officer. 
 Major (Army Reserve) I. Dupont
 Captain-Commandant (Air Force) Baudouin Heuninckx
 Master Warrant Officer G. Janssen
 Warrant Officer Dirk Brans
 Warrant Officer F. Christiaens
 Warrant Officer John Claerhout
 Warrant Officer Stephan Hussin
 First Sergeant Ian Dierckx
 Corporal D. Tricot
 Private First Class Nordine Boukhalfa

2007 
The Medal of Military Merit was awarded to nine members of the Belgian Armed Forces. 
 Chief Warrant Officer P. Istas
 Warrant Officer Kris Donne
 Warrant Officer Franky Wheaton
 First Sergeant-Major Jozef Van Lancker
 First Master Sergeant A. Pillitteri
 First Master Corporal F. De Paepe
 First Master Corporal D. Giangiulio
 First Master Corporal Georges Surkyn 
 First Master Corporal M. Van Thillo

2006 
The Medal of Military Merit was awarded to eleven members of the Belgian Armed Forces. 
 Captain-Commandant P. Dumon
 Master Warrant Officer G. Lenders
 Master Warrant Officer L. Marechal
 Master Warrant Officer Gino Van Eeckhout
 Warrant Officer L. Bouvy
 Warrant Officer P. Schepmans
 Warrant Officer G. Verlent
 First Master Corporal D. Ladangh
 First Master Corporal Hugues Prevost
 First Master Corporal M.-C. Vandeweert
 First Master Corporal I. Verdeyen

2005 
The Medal of Military Merit was awarded to four members of the Belgian Armed Forces. 
 Sergeant Yoann Severijns
 Master Corporal J.-P. Doyen
 Master Corporal S. Vanmalleghem
 Private First Class M. Toussaint

See also 
 Medal of Military Merit (Belgium)
 List of Belgian military decorations

References 
 Royal Decree 811 of 16 June 2015
 Royal Decree 674 of 24 January 2015
 Royal Decree 633 of 16 December 2014
 Royal Decree 483 of 23 August 2014
 Royal Decree 191 of 21 December 2013
 Royal Decree 63 of 14 October 2013
 Royal Decree 9508 of 24 April 2013
 Royal Decree 9115 of 17 December 2012
 Royal Decree 9078 of 6 September 2012
 Royal Decree 8966 of 9 May 2012
 Royal Decree 8745 of 8 February 2012
 Royal Decree 8389 of 26 May 2011
 Royal Decree 8295 of 14 February 2011
 Royal Decree 8085 of 4 July 2010
 Royal Decree 8028 of 21 April 2010
 Royal Decree 7558 of 29 April 2009
 Royal Decree 7264 of 15 October 2008
 Royal Decree 7056 of 9 April 2008
 Royal Decree 6707 of 31 August 2007
 Royal Decree 6571 of 9 May 2007
 Royal Decree 6052 of 11 May 2006
 Royal Decree 5656 of 22 September 2005
 Royal Decree of 23 February 2005 Creating a Medal of Merit for Personnel of the Defence Forces and Foreign Armed Forces (Moniteur Belge of 1 April 2005) 
 Belgian military regulation DGHR-SPS-DECOR-001 of 18 January 2006

Military awards and decorations of Belgium
Recipients of Belgian military awards and decorations